The Bhagidari Parivartan Morcha is a Political Alliance of All India Majlis-e-Ittehadul Muslimeen, Jan Adhikar Party of Babu Singh Kushwaha, Rashtriya Parivartan Morcha of Waman Meshram, Bahujan Mukti Party, Bhartiya Vanchit Samaj Party and Janata Kranti Party for 2022 Uttar Pradesh Legislative Assembly election. Morcha had promised Two Chief Ministers and Three Deputy Chief Ministers if they come to power. Morcha decided to support Candidates of Peace Party of India in February 2022.

Candidates

References 

Bhagidari Parivartan Morcha
2022 establishments in India